Piz da la Margna (3,158 m) is a mountain in the Bernina Range of the Alps, overlooking Lake Sils in the Swiss canton of Graubünden. It lies to the south-east of the Maloja Pass at the south-western end of the Engadin valley.

Ascents can be made from Maloja via the north ridge (F); a slightly easier route is via the Val Fedoz and the east flank. The south-east ridge from the Fuorcla da la Margna (AD, IV) was first climbed by Hans Frick, Christian Zippert and Hans Casper on 14 August 1918.

The first recorded ‘tourist’ ascent of the mountain was made by J. Caviezel, Krättli, Robbi and Zaun in June 1857.

References

External links
 Piz da la Margna on Summitpost
 Piz da la Margna on Hikr
 Webcam looking towards Piz da la Margna
 Nächtliche Winterlandschaft mit Piz da la Margna (painting by Giovanni Giacometti, 1913)

Margna
Engadin
Margna
Alpine three-thousanders
Margna
Mountains of Graubünden
Bregaglia